Clasmatocolea fasciculata is a species of liverwort belonging to the family Lophocoleaceae. It is known from South Africa where it grows on woody debris.

References

Jungermanniales
Flora of South Africa
Plants described in 1960